The 22123 / 24 Pune–Ajni AC Superfast Express is a Superfast Express train of the AC Express series belonging to Indian Railways – Central Railway zone that runs between  and  in India.

It operates as train number 22123 from Pune Junction to Ajni and as train number 22124 in the reverse direction, serving the state of Maharashtra.

Coaches

The 22123 / 24 Pune–Ajni AC Superfast Express has 9 AC 3 tier, 4 AC 2 Tier & 2 End on Generator coaches. It doesn't carry a pantry car .

As is customary with most train services in India, coach composition may be amended at the discretion of Indian Railways depending on demand.

 EOG consists of Luggage and Generator coach
 B consists of AC 3 Tier coach
 PC consists of Pantry car coach
 A consists of AC 2 Tier coach
 H consists of First Class AC cCoach

Service

As the average speed of the train is above , as per Indian Railways rules, its fare includes a Superfast Express surcharge.

Routeing

Traction

As the route is fully electrified, an Ajni-based WAP-7 locomotive powers the train up to its destination.

Rake sharing

22117 / 22118 Pune–Amravati AC Superfast Express
22125 / 22126 Nagpur–Amritsar AC Superfast Express

Operation

22123 Pune–Ajni AC Superfast Express leaves Pune Junction every Friday & arriving Ajni on next day.
22124 Ajni–Pune AC Superfast Express leaves Ajni every Tuesday & arriving Pune Junction on next day.

References

External links
22123 AC Superfast Express at India Rail Info
22124 AC Superfast Express at India Rail Info

Transport in Pune
Rail transport in Maharashtra
Transport in Amravati
AC Express (Indian Railways) trains